Marjorie Beaucage (born 1947) is a Canadian Métis activist filmmaker and teacher from Manitoba.

Early life and education
Beaucage was born in Vassar, Manitoba in 1947. She obtained a degree in education from the University of Brandon and studied film at Ryerson University.

Career
Beaucage spent 25 years in adult education and community organizing before turning to film in her 40s. Her documentary films are often collaborative in nature and have reflected the participation of Indigenous peoples in political forums, conferences, local activism, and community events. Her 1997 film Ntapueu... i am telling the truth followed the environmental impact work of the Innu Nation regarding a mining project in Labrador's Voisey's Bay. She was invited by the Innu to capture their work following her documentation of the efforts of elders in northern Saskatchewan during a 1992 Wiggins Bay blockage in opposition to the province's clearcutting policies 

In 2017 Beaucage released Coming In Stories: Two Spirit in Saskatchewan in an attempt to raise awareness about the experiences of two-spirit individuals in Saskatchewan. The coordinator of OUTSaskatoon and a two-spirit person herself, Beaucage explained in an interview with the Saskatoon StarPhoenix that she made the film because of the number of people who don't understand the role and experiences of two spirit individuals: "there are really young people that have lived experiences and need support, so the film was created to be intimate face-to-face storytelling that opens people's hearts and helps them to understand in a way they didn't before."

Beaucage is the co-founder of the Aboriginal Film and Video Art Alliance.

Films
Bingo (1991)
Good Grief (1993)
China... Through One Woman’s Eyes (1996)
Ntapueu... i am telling the truth (1997)
Proz Anthology (2000)
Coming In Stories: Two Spirit in Saskatchewan (2017)

Awards

References

External links

Métis filmmakers
Two-spirit people
1947 births
Living people
Canadian documentary film directors
LGBT film directors
LGBT First Nations people
Canadian women film directors
Canadian women documentary filmmakers